The Bangladesh Armed Forces award medals and their associated ribbon bars in recognition of various levels of service, personal accomplishments and commemorative events while a regular serviceperson is a member of the Bangladesh Army, Bangladesh Navy and the Bangladesh Air Force. Together with military badges, such awards are a means to outwardly display the highlights of a serviceperson's career.

Military medals 
Decorations in the order of precedence:

Wartime gallantry awards

Peacetime gallantry awards 
 Bir Sorbottam- (literally, "The Foremost Braves"), the highest gallantry award 
 Bir Mrittunjoee- (literally, "The Immortal Braves"), the second highest gallantry award 
 Bir Chiranjib- (literally, " The Incorruptible Braves"), the third highest gallantry award 
 Bir Durjoy- (literally, "The Indomitable Braves"), the fourth highest gallantry award

Liberation War medals

Service and campaign medals

Army service medals

Navy service medals

Campaign medals

Service medals

Long service awards

United Nations Service medals

Order of Military Merit

Commendation Padak 
The Commendation Padak is awarded to all members of the Bangladesh Army, Bangladesh Navy and Bangladesh Air Force, who have received the commendation letter.

Blood Donor Medal 
The Blood Donor Medal is awarded to all persons of the Bangladesh Army, Bangladesh Navy and Bangladesh Air Force who have donated blood three times.

See also
Liberation War of Bangladesh
Bangladeshi honours system
Awards and decorations of the Bangladesh Liberation War
Bangladesh Army
Bangladesh Navy
Bangladesh Air Force

References